The Golden Horse Award for Best Original Film Score is an award presented annually at the Golden Horse Awards by the Taipei Golden Horse Film Festival Executive Committee. The latest ceremony was held in 2022, with Wong Hin-yan winning the award for the film The Narrow Road.

References

Golden Horse Film Awards